It's a Very Merry Muppet Christmas Movie is a 2002 American musical fantasy comedy television film directed by Kirk R. Thatcher and written by Tom Martin and Jim Lewis. The film premiered November 29, 2002 on NBC and the first film to be made for television for The Muppets franchise.

It stars Steve Whitmire, Dave Goelz, Bill Barretta, Eric Jacobson, Dave Arquette, Joan Cusack, Matthew Lillard, William H. Macy, and Whoopi Goldberg. The plot centers on Kermit the Frog who, after losing all hope for saving the Muppet Theatre, is assisted by an angel who shows him a world in which he was never born. The film is a homage to Frank Capra's 1946 film It's a Wonderful Life, which has a similar plot.

This was the first Muppets production without the involvement of veteran Muppet performer Frank Oz. Instead, Eric Jacobson performed Oz's characters Fozzie Bear, Miss Piggy, and Animal, marking his feature film debut as those characters. The film is also one of the few Muppets-related productions that are currently not owned by The Walt Disney Company, and along with Sam and Friends are owned by NBCUniversal.

This is also the final Muppets material from The Jim Henson Company, as The Muppets were in their final years of ownership by Henson before being sold to Disney in 2004.

Plot
During the holiday season, the Muppet Theater is going through financial hardship, and the Muppets are seeking Kermit the Frog for guidance. Kermit eventually feels he is not useful to anyone and an angel named Daniel (David Arquette) brings this up with his Boss (Whoopi Goldberg) as they review what has gone on with Kermit in the past hours.

Hours earlier, Kermit prepares a Christmas show with his fellow Muppets with Bobo the Bear playing Santa Claus. Kermit is approached by Rachel Bitterman (Joan Cusack), a banker/real estate agent who says she will foreclose the Muppet Theater if Kermit does not pay her. Pepe the King Prawn leaves the Muppets because he has fallen in love with Bitterman. Miss Piggy leaves the Muppets to go and work in Hollywood. While trying to raise money to pay Bitterman, Kermit tries to find a celebrity to participate in his Christmas play to no avail. Kermit travels out to California and retrieves Miss Piggy, who gets fired working as an extra on the TV series Scrubs.

Meanwhile, after learning from Pepe that the deadline is midnight, Bitterman changes it to 6:00 p.m. Pepe overhears this and sets about informing Kermit about the deadline change, but Pepe keeps being interrupted. The Muppets perform their Christmas musical Moulin Scrooge (a parody of the film Moulin Rouge!) and Pepe continues trying to talk to Kermit. The musical is a success, concluding with a standing ovation. After the show, Pepe finally explains to Kermit that the deadline has changed and shows him the contract. Kermit sends Fozzie to deliver the money to Bitterman. Fozzie confronts a crazed nature-show host (spoofing Steve Irwin), and a gang of Whos after being dyed green at a Christmas tree lot and mistaken for the Grinch by some angry Whos. Fozzie goes through the steam baths and ends up back to normal where he throws off the Whos. When Fozzie eventually makes it to the bank and Bitterman's office, he goes through a gigantic web of burning lasers leading to Bitterman's office several times before finally discovering that he is too late and that he has grabbed the wrong bag containing clothes for the Salvation Army following his incident at the Christmas tree lot.

After witnessing these events, the Boss allows Daniel to help Kermit. When Daniel arrives, and after Kermit wishes he has never been born, he ends up showing Kermit what would have happened if he had not existed. In the world without Kermit, Bitterman has turned the park near the Muppet Theater into a shopping mall called Bitterman Plaza, the Muppet Theater itself has become a nightclub called Club Dot owned by Bitterman, Doc Hopper's French-Fried Frog Legs (first seen in The Muppet Movie) has become a famous fast-food restaurant, and all of Kermit's friends have fallen into various detrimental situations.

Kermit has Daniel restore him back to his reality and returns to the Muppet Theater. However, Bitterman arrives to shut the theater down and fights with Miss Piggy. Pepe arrives where he breaks up the fight and announces he has made the Muppet Theater into a historical landmark, foiling Bitterman's plan. Embittered and defeated, Bitterman storms out of the Muppet Theater.

Outside, the Muppets sing "We Wish You a Merry Christmas".

Cast
 David Arquette as Daniel, an angel who appears to Kermit at Christmas
 Joan Cusack as Rachel Bitterman, a spoiled, rich young banker/real estate developer
 Matthew Lillard as Luc Fromage, a foppish French choreographer
 Whoopi Goldberg as The Boss, the Creator of the Universe
 William H. Macy as Glenn, an angel
 Mel Brooks as Joe Snow (voice only), parodying Sam the Snowman from Rudolph the Red-Nosed Reindeer
 Chantal Strand as Nancy Nut-What
 Dave "Squatch" Ward as Sally Ann Santa Claus

Muppets performers

 Steve Whitmire as Kermit the Frog, Rizzo the Rat, Beaker, Bean Bunny
 Dave Goelz as The Great Gonzo, Dr. Bunsen Honeydew, Waldorf, Zoot, Beauregard
 Bill Barretta as Pepé the King Prawn, Bobo the Bear, Johnny Fiama, Swedish Chef, Lew Zealand, Howard Tubman, Rowlf the Dog
 Eric Jacobson as Miss Piggy, Fozzie Bear, Animal, Yoda
 Brian Henson as Scooter, Janice, Sal Minella
 Kevin Clash as Sam Eagle
 John Henson as Sweetums
 John Kennedy as Dr. Teeth
 Jerry Nelson as Robin the Frog, Statler, Floyd Pepper, Announcer
 Allan Trautman as Joe Snow (puppetry only), Eugene the Tuba Player

Additional Muppet Performers: Alice Dinnean, Geoff Redknap, Denise Cheshire, Drew Massey, Adam Behr, and Gord Robertson.

Cameo guest stars
 Zach Braff as himself/Dr. John "J.D." Dorian
 Sarah Chalke as herself/Dr. Elliot Reid
 Carson Daly as himself
 Snoop Dogg as himself (deleted scene)
 Neil Flynn as himself/Janitor
 Bill Lawrence as himself
 John C. McGinley as himself/Dr. Perry Cox
 Judy Reyes as herself/Nurse Carla Espinosa
 Kelly Ripa as herself
 Joe Rogan as himself
 Molly Shannon as herself
 Robert Smigel as Triumph the Insult Comic Dog

Production notes
Veteran Muppet performer Jerry Nelson was ill during filming, so most of his characters were puppeteered on set by others and later dubbed by Nelson in post-production. The exception was Nelson's character Lew Zealand, who was performed by Bill Barretta. Sam Eagle, a character originally performed by Frank Oz, was voiced in the film by Kevin Clash, while John Kennedy provided the on set puppetry.

Scooter, performed in the film by Brian Henson, makes his first major appearance since the death of his initial performer, Richard Hunt. Hunt's character Janice was also performed by Henson and has a speaking role for the first time since Hunt's death.

The film contains an original song, "Everyone Matters", performed by Kermit and Gonzo as part of the world in which he had never been born, and then reprised at the end. The film also makes reference to the classic Muppet song "Rainbow Connection", featuring a statue of Kermit in a park, erected in dedication "for the lovers, the dreamers and you".

The movie was filmed prior to the September 11 attacks; one scene, set in a version of 2003 where Kermit was never born, shows the Twin Towers visible in the background. Years after the film's release, this detail gained viral attention, inspiring jokes that Kermit was responsible for 9/11.

See also
 List of Christmas films
 List of films about angels
 Santa Claus in film

References

External links

 

2002 television films
2002 films
American comedy television films
American Christmas films
Christmas television films
The Jim Henson Company films
NBC network original films
American children's films
Films about wish fulfillment
The Muppets films
American sequel films
Television sequel films
Metro-Goldwyn-Mayer direct-to-video films
Films directed by Kirk Thatcher
Films scored by Mark Watters
2000s English-language films
2000s American films